The 2016–17 Panathinaikos season is the club's 58th consecutive season in Super League Greece. They are also competing in the UEFA Europa League and Greek Cup.

Players

Out of team with contract

Transfers

In

Total spending:  €2,550,000

Out

Total income:  €580,000

Pre-season and friendlies

Competitions

Super League Greece

Regular season

League table

Matches

Play-offs

Table

Matches

Greek Cup

Group C

Round of 16

Quarter-finals

Semi-finals

UEFA Europa League

Qualifying phase

Third qualifying round

Play-off round

Group G

References

External links
 Panathinaikos FC official website

Panathinaikos
Panathinaikos F.C. seasons
Panathinaikos